"La golondrina" (English: "The Swallow") is a song written in 1862 by Mexican physician Narciso Serradell Sevilla (1843–1910), who at the time was exiled to France due to the French intervention in Mexico.

The lyrics come from a poem written in Arabic by the last Abencerrages king of Granada, Aben Humeya, in a translation by Niceto de Zamacois, which Sevilla found in a magazine used as packing material.

The Spanish lyrics use the image of a migrating swallow to evoke sentiments of longing for the homeland. It became the signature song of the exiled Mexicans. The song was recorded in 1906 by Señor Francisco. A guitar instrumental was recorded by Chet Atkins in 1955. The song has also been recorded by Caterina Valente (1959), Nat King Cole (1962), Plácido Domingo (1984), Flaco Jiménez (1992, instrumental), Caetano Veloso (1994), and Guadalupe Pineda (2004).  
In 1948, Gene Autry sang the song in his Cinecolor film, "The Big Sombrero".

Felice & Boudleaux Bryant wrote lyrics in English, as "She Wears My Ring", which was first recorded by Jimmy Sweeney (also known as Jimmy Bell) in 1960 with notable cover versions by Roy Orbison (1962), Johnny O'Keefe (1964), Ray Price and Solomon King (both 1968), and Elvis Presley (1973).

The song figures prominently in the 1969 film The Wild Bunch, directed by Sam Peckinpah and scored by Jerry Fielding. The local people serenade the bandit protagonists with it as they leave Angel's Mexican village.

The song, recorded by 13-year-old Heintje, became a German number-one hit in August 1968 (title: Du sollst nicht weinen, "Thou shalt not cry").

Anita Hegerland version
In June 1970, the 9-year-old Norwegian singer Anita Hegerland became a famed child singer with a recording in Swedish  (Mitt sommarlov, "My summer break") that topped the Swedish best selling chart Kvällstoppen for five weeks and  Svensktoppen for seven weeks as well as the Norwegian singles chart for three weeks. At age 10, she became Norway's first artist to sell over a million copies and she now is one of the best-selling solo singers in Norway, with sales of more than 7 million albums and singles. Hegerland's songs have been released on nearly 30 million albums worldwide, most of which are with Roy Black and Mike Oldfield.

Charts

References

Elvis Presley songs
1862 songs
Songs written by Felice and Boudleaux Bryant
Anita Hegerland songs
Ray Price (musician) songs
Caterina Valente songs
1967 singles
Mexican folk songs